Bass Lake is a census-designated place in Madera County, California, United States. The population was 575 at the 2020 census.

Established in 1895 as "Bass Lake Village", the community grew up around the newly created Bass Lake reservoir that supplied the first hydroelectric generating project in Central California. Much of the community and the reservoir is devoted to the tourism industry.

The original post office at Bass Lake opened in 1912.

The ZIP Codes for Bass Lake are 93604 and 93669, and it is in the 559 area code.

Geography

Demographics

At the 2010 census Bass Lake had a population of 527. The racial makeup of Bass Lake was 503 (95.4%) White, 1 (0.2%) African American, 10 (1.9%) Native American, 1 (0.2%) Asian, 0 (0.0%) Pacific Islander, 2 (0.4%) from other races, and 10 (1.9%) from two or more races. Hispanic or Latino of any race were 22 people (4.2%).

The whole population lived in households, no one lived in non-institutionalized group quarters and no one was institutionalized.

There were 275 households, 30 (10.9%) had children under the age of 18 living in them, 138 (50.2%) were opposite-sex married couples living together, 19 (6.9%) had a female householder with no husband present, 9 (3.3%) had a male householder with no wife present.  There were 16 (5.8%) unmarried opposite-sex partnerships, and 2 (0.7%) same-sex married couples or partnerships. 92 households (33.5%) were one person and 57 (20.7%) had someone living alone who was 65 or older. The average household size was 1.92.  There were 166 families (60.4% of households); the average family size was 2.35.

The age distribution was 57 people (10.8%) under the age of 18, 18 people (3.4%) aged 18 to 24, 55 people (10.4%) aged 25 to 44, 169 people (32.1%) aged 45 to 64, and 228 people (43.3%) who were 65 or older.  The median age was 62.3 years. For every 100 females, there were 86.9 males.  For every 100 females age 18 and over, there were 84.3 males.

There were 1,059 housing units at an average density of 424.8 per square mile, of the occupied units 230 (83.6%) were owner-occupied and 45 (16.4%) were rented. The homeowner vacancy rate was 11.1%; the rental vacancy rate was 48.9%.  428 people (81.2% of the population) lived in owner-occupied housing units and 99 people (18.8%) lived in rental housing units.

References

External links
 Official National Weather Service Reporting Station
 Bass Lake weather and lake conditions
 Bass Lake, CA Chamber of Commerce 
 Oakhurst Area Chamber of Commerce

Census-designated places in Madera County, California
Populated places in the Sierra Nevada (United States)
Sierra National Forest
1895 establishments in California
Populated places established in 1895
Census-designated places in California